Alfred John Thraves FRIBA (1888-15 August 1953) was an architect based in Nottingham  who specialised in cinema design.

History
He was the son of Joseph Henry Thraves and Agnes Rosina Kraft. He married Florence A E Sharp in 1912. Their son Lionel Alfred Thraves was born on 18 March 1915.

He was articled to John Lamb in Nottingham and started his own practice in 1910.

During the First World War he was a private in the Duke of Cornwall's Light Infantry and held a commission in the Royal Engineers, and was on active service in France and Belgium.

He was in partnership with Henry Hardwick Dawson until 1927 and with his son Lionel Alfred Thraves from 1937, based in Whitefriars House, Nottingham.

During the Second World War he served as a special constable in Nottingham. In 1943 he was appointed a housing consultant to the Ministry of Health.

He died on 15 August 1953 at The Turrett, Stanton-on-the-Wolds, Nottinghamshire and left an estate valued at £8,478 11s 3d.

Works
10 Short Hill, Nottingham 1909
Palais de Danse, Nottingham 1924-25 
Cottages. Bramcote Drive, Beeston. 1921-22
Majestic Theatre, Coronation Street, Retford 1927
National Provincial Bank, Valley Road/Nottingham Road, Basford, Nottingham 1928
Empress Cinema, St Ann's Well Road, Nottingham 1928
Majestic Cinema, 700 Woodborough Road, Mapperley, Nottingham 1929
St. Giles Parish Hall (later Lutterell Hall), Church Drive, West Bridgford, 1929
Tudor Cinema, 50 North Street, Bourne 1929
Plaza Cinema, Mansfield 1930 (later the Granada Cinema)
Regent Cinema, Diamond Avenue/Station Street, East Kirkby 1930
Tudor Cinema, 24 Tudor Square, West Bridgford, Nottingham 1931
Three houses. Derby Road, Beeston. 1931-32
Five houses. Hillside Road, Beeston. 1932
House. 185 Derby Road, Beeston. 1932
House. 207 Derby Road, Beeston. 1932
House. 209 Derby Road, Beeston. 1932
Plaza Cinema, Trent Bridge, Nottingham 1932
Dale Cinema, Sneinton Dale/Hardstaff Road, Nottingham 1932
House. 23 Wollaton Vale, Beeston. 1932-33
House. 25 Wollaton Vale, Beeston. 1932-33
Eight houses. Derby Road, Beeston. 1932-33
Bungalow. 2 Coniston Road, Beeston. 1932-33
Bungalow. 4 Coniston Road, Beeston. 1932-33
Majestic Cinema, 21 Alexandra Road, Swadlincote 1933
Tudor Cinema, Grange Road, West Kirby, Merseyside 1933
Parade Super Cinema, Skegness, 1933
Houses. 211 Derby Road, Beeston. 1933
Eight houses. Derby Road, Beeston. 1933
Four houses. Hillside Road, Beeston. 1933 (with Calvert and Jessop)
House. 104 Hillside Road, Beeston. 1933-34
House. 20 Keswick Close, Bramcote. 1933-34
Three houses. Derby Road, Beeston. 1934
Houses. 24 Derby Road, Beeston. 1934
King's Cinema, Outram Street/Forest Street, Sutton in Ashfield 1935
Regal Cinema, Parliament Street, Nottingham 1935
Byron Cinema, High Street/Duke Street, Hucknall 1936
Cinema, Nottingham Road, Basford 1936
Astoria Cinema, Derby Road, Lenton Abbey, Nottingham 1936
Two houses. High Road, Beeston. 1936-37
House. 6 Coniston Road, Beeston. 1937
House. 5 Coniston Road, Beeston. 1937
Regal Cinema, West Street, Boston 1937
Forum Cinema, Aspley Lane, Aspley, Nottingham 1937
Futurist Cinema, 551 Valley Road, Basford, Nottingham 1937
Savoy Cinema, Station Road, Sutton-in-Ashfield 1937
Savoy Cinema, Westlode Street, Spalding 1937
Six houses. 2-12 Grasmere Road, Beeston. 1937-38
Windsor Cinema, Warmsworth Road/Oswin Avenue, Balby, Doncaster 1938
Gloria Cinema, Nottingham Road and Meadow Lane, Derby 1938 (later the Ladbroke Film Centre)
House. 72 Beeston Fields Drive, Beeston. 1938-39
Windsor Cinema, Hartley Road, Radford, Nottingham 1939
Astra Cinema, Wheatley, Doncaster 1939
R. Cripps and Company Motor Showroom and Garage, Parliament Street/Barker Gate, Nottingham 1939
Wood, Bastow and Company Factory, Nottingham Road, Selston 1939-40

References

20th-century English architects
Architects from Nottingham
Fellows of the Royal Institute of British Architects